Cancer mortality rates are determined by the complex relationship of a population's health and lifestyle with their healthcare system.  In the United States during 2013–2017, the age-adjusted mortality rate for all types of cancer was 189.5/100,000 for males, and 135.7/100,000 for females. Below is an incomplete list of age-adjusted mortality rates for different types of cancer in the United States from the Surveillance, Epidemiology, and End Results program.

References

Cancer mortality rates